Travel insurance is an insurance product for covering unforeseen losses incurred while travelling, either internationally or domestically. Basic policies generally only cover emergency medical expenses while overseas, while comprehensive policies typically include coverage for trip cancellation, lost luggage, flight delays, public liability, and other expenses.

Policy purchase

Cost calculation 
Travel insurance, are risk-based, and take into account a range of factors to determine whether a traveller can purchase a policy and what the premium will be. This generally includes destination countries or regions, the duration of the trip, the age of the travellers, and any optional benefits that they require coverage for such as pre-existing medical conditions, adventure sports, rental vehicle excess, cruising, or high-value electronics. Some policies will also take into account the traveller's estimated value of their trip to determine price. A policy may be a single trip, covering the exact duration of the upcoming trip, or a "multi-trip" policy can cover an unlimited number of trips of limited duration within a year.

Journey departure and return conditions 
Most travel insurance policies must be purchased prior to departure from home, or from the first departure point (e.g. an airport), depending on the product. A smaller number of brands offer travel insurance for travellers who are already overseas and have forgotten to purchase travel insurance or have a policy which has expired. Most policies require ones to start and finish one's journey in one's country of residence. However some policies offer coverage for one-way travel for people who are permanently relocating to another country.

Complimentary travel insurance 
Some credit card issuers offer automatic travel insurance if travel arrangements are paid for using their credit cards, but these policies are generic and do not take into account personal requirements and circumstances.

Common benefits

Medical 
In the event of minor injury or illness overseas, medical benefits offer coverage for visits to general practitioners, medicine, ambulance fees, and limited dentistry benefits. In the event of hospitalisation, most travel insurance policies include emergency assistance services, which can offer guarantees of payment to hospitals for treatment, liaise treating doctors, and organise transfers between hospitals or medical evacuations back to the insured person's country of origin. More comprehensive policies include an emergency companion cover, so that a family member can remain with the insured person while in hospital.

In the event of death overseas, medical benefit sections typically include cover for repatriation of remains to insured person's the country of origin, or a funeral overseas.

Cancellation 
Comprehensive travel insurance policies include cover for any cancellation fees or lost deposits relating to cancellation of the insured's person's trip for a range of unforeseen and unexpected circumstances. These include illness or injury, natural disasters and bad weather, strikes and riots, hijacking, and family emergencies. Depending on the policy, it may also include cancellation due to jury service, being made redundant from full-time employment, having annual leave revoked for those in the armed forces or emergency services, and prohibition of or advisory against travel by a government to a particular destination.

Alternative transport and travel expenses 
Many policies include benefits for alternative transport, accommodation, and meal expenses if the transport provider is delayed by a certain period, provided any layover times met the criteria in the policy. Policies may also include a benefit to purchase essential items like clothing and toiletries in the event baggage is delayed by an airline.

Luggage 
Luggage benefits cover for loss, damage or theft of personal effects during one's journey, including passports and other travel documents. It may also include limited benefits for theft of cash.

Public liability 
This covers legal liability as a result of a claim made against the covered party for bodily injuries or damage to property of other persons.

Optional benefits
In addition to their base policies, many providers offer coverage for declared pre-existing conditions (e.g. asthma, diabetes, cancer), higher risk sports and activities (e.g. skiing, trekking at high altitudes, scuba diving), rental car damage, and cruising.

Common exclusions
Insurance companies issuing will often exclude coverage for ongoing known events to new policies, and may announce long-term exclusions for specific events, such as volcanic activity from a currently active volcano. As travel insurance is a risk-based product, many policies will exclude events which may be of a far-reaching and poorly quantified risk, such as pandemics and endemics, acts of war, and terrorism. Some policies exclude travel to certain countries, or parts of countries, where a greater risk is expected. These determinations are often made based on official government travel advice from organisations such as the US State Department or the Australian Department of Foreign Affairs.

Other common exclusions in travel insurance policies include: 

 undeclared pre-existing medical conditions
 unlicensed operation of a motorcycle 
 travelling for the purpose of receiving medical treatment 
 elective surgery or treatment 
 Injury or illness caused by reckless activity such as careless driving, use of alcohol, use of recreational drugs 
 leaving belongings unattended
 participating in high risk sports and activities (such as scuba diving, extreme sports)
 travelling against government advice and recommendations

Compulsory travel insurance
Certain countries require foreign visitors have proof of sufficient travel insurance as a condition for granting a visa or of approving visa-free entry. This includes travellers applying for a Schengen Area or UAE visa, and all visitors to Cuba, Turkey and Belarus.  Thailand and Egypt have announced plans to introduce similar requirements. Tour companies and cruise providers may also require passengers possess a minimum level of travel insurance before the traveller can commence their journey.

See also
Visitor health insurance

References

External links

 Travel Insurance Advice UK from the British Foreign & Commonwealth Office 
 Travel Insurance Advice USA from the U.S. Department of State
 Travel Advisories CA from Canadian Government
 Travel Insurance Advice AU from Australian Government
 Travel Insurance Advice IN from Indian Government